Elmer Hildebrand   (born 1935) is a Canadian businessman, investor, philanthropist and broadcaster from Altona, Manitoba and current CEO & President of Golden West Broadcasting (Canada). Hildebrand joined Golden West in 1961, just four years after its inception, and served as president for many decades, growing the company to more than forty radio stations, and the largest independent radio broadcaster in Canada. He is a former director of the Canadian Association of Broadcasters and was inducted into the CAB Hall of Fame, Manitoba Business Hall of Fame, and Manitoba Hockey Hall of Fame. He also served as President of the Mennonite Heritage Village in Steinbach, Manitoba.

He was awarded the Order of Manitoba in 2007 and made a member of the Order of Canada in 2013.

He lives in Winnipeg with his wife Hilda and also owns a historic Mennonite housebarn in Neubergthal, Manitoba, a National Historic Site of Canada.

References 

1935 births
Canadian Mennonites
21st-century Canadian businesspeople
20th-century Canadian businesspeople
Members of the Order of Canada
Living people